The 2007 Cork Senior Hurling Championship was the 11th staging of the Cork Senior Hurling Championship since its establishment by the Cork County Board in 1887. The draw for the 2017 fixtures took place in December 2006. The championship began on 20 April 2007 and ended on 14 October 2007.

Erin's Own were the defending champions.

Douglas were relegated from the championship after losing two play-off games in the relegation section.

On 14 October 2007, Erin's Own won the championship following a 1-11 to 1-7 defeat of Newrownshandrum in the final. This was their third championship title ever and their second title in succession.

Team changes

To Championship

Promoted from the Cork Premier Intermediate Hurling Championship
 Bishopstown

From Championship

Relegated from the Cork Senior Hurling Championship
 Delaney Rovers

Results

Round 1

Round 2

Relegation play-off

Divisional/colleges section

Round 3

Quarter-finals

Semi-finals

Final

Championship statistics

Scoring statistics

Top scorers overall

Top scorers in a single game

References

Cork Senior Hurling Championship
Cork Senior Hurling Championship